Charles Woodburn (born March 1971) is a British businessman who has been the CEO of BAE Systems since July 2017.

Education 
Woodburn earned a bachelor's degree in electrical sciences from St John's College, Cambridge in 1992 and a PhD in engineering from Cambridge University, followed by an MBA from Erasmus University Rotterdam.

Career 
Before working for BAE Systems, Woodburn was chief executive of Expro Group, which surveys and manages oil and gas wells around the world. He had also spent 15 years at Schlumberger, an oil services company, overseeing major projects in Thailand, Australia, and the US.

On joining BAE Systems he was to be paid a base salary of £750,000 a year and given more than £1.6m to buy him out of incentive schemes at Expro. It was reported in December 2016 that he was paid a total joining package worth £3 million. In 2021, Woodburn received a salary rise of 13% to bring his annual pay to £1.1 million. He is also in line for an extra £2 million long-term share award payable if he stays at BAE until the end of 2023.

References

1971 births
Alumni of St John's College, Cambridge
BAE Systems people
British chief executives
Erasmus University Rotterdam alumni
Living people
People from Windsor, Berkshire